The 7th New York Infantry Regiment was an infantry regiment that served in the Union Army during the American Civil War. It was composed almost entirely of German immigrants and is also known as the Steuben Guard or the Steuben Regiment. It should not be confused with the 7th New York Militia, an entirely different regiment whose service overlapped with the 7th New York Volunteers.

Service
The regiment was organized in New York City and was mustered in for a two-year enlistment on April 23, 1861. 
Early in its training, it was so poorly equipped that a civilian who visited the troops wrote a letter to the editor of The New York Times (published May 16, 1861) complaining that tailors within the regiment had to resew the uniforms and put buttons on them, and that some of the soldiers were wearing "flip-flaps". The letter-writer was impressed (spelling and punctuation as in the original):

I have seen no troops before, and I have seen none since, in which there was the same indescribable aspect of discipline. The men were not in uniform, but very poorly dressed, — in many cases with flip-flap shoes. The business-like air with which they marched rapidly through the deep mud of the Third-avenue was the more remarkable.

With "one or two exceptions" almost every officer then in the regiment had experience in European armies, and six out of eight of the soldiers had seen service, often in battle. "The only arms they have as yet are a few old muskets bought by the officers themselves."

The regiment was mustered out of service on May 8, 1863.

Casualties
The regiment suffered 102 deaths from wounds and 47 from other causes, for a total of 149 fatalities.

Commanders
Colonel John E. Bendix
Colonel Edward Kapff
Colonel George W. Von Schack 
Lieutenant Colonel Frederick Gaebel

See also
List of New York Civil War regiments
7th New York Militia

References

External links

New York State Military Museum and Veterans Research Center - Civil War - 7th Infantry Regiment History, photographs, table of battles and casualties, Civil War newspaper clippings, and historical sketch, for the 7th New York Infantry Regiment.
 
 https://civilwarintheeast.com/us-army-feb-63/aop-feb-63/2-corps-aop-feb-63/1-div-2-corps-feb-63/
Infantry 007
1861 establishments in New York (state)
Military units and formations established in 1861
Military units and formations disestablished in 1863